Michael Peterson (born November 29, 1982) is a former American football tight end. He was signed by the Green Bay Packers as an undrafted free agent in 2008. He played college football at Northwest Missouri State Bearcats football.

Peterson also played for the Omaha Nighthawks.

Professional career

Green Bay Packers
Peterson was waived by the Packers on July 26, 2008.

Omaha Nighthawks
Peterson signed with the Omaha Nighthawks of the United Football League in July 2010. He was released on November 14.

References

External links
Just Sports Stats

1982 births
Living people
People from Atlantic, Iowa
Players of American football from Iowa
American football tight ends
Northwest Missouri State Bearcats football players
Green Bay Packers players
Omaha Nighthawks players